, sometimes credited as Shōji Kobayashi, was a Japanese actor. He attended Nihon University College of Art, but withdrew before completing his degree and joined the Haiyuza Theatre Company in 1949.  He made his film debut with Satsujin Yogisha in 1952.

He is best known in the West for portraying the role of Captain Toshio Muramatsu in the 1966-1967 television series, Ultraman. From 1983-84, he appeared in popular television detective series Seibu Keisatsu. His other notable television role was Tōbei Tachibana ("Oya-san") in several series of the Kamen Rider franchise. He was one of the Kon Ichikawa's favorite actors, appearing in 12 Ichikawa's films. His final film appearance was Yatsuhaka-mura as Head of a factory directed by Kon Ichikawa in 1996. He was the official dubbing artist of John Wayne and Richard Crenna. Kobayashi died of lung cancer in Yokohama on August 27, 1996, ten days before his 66th birthday.

Partial filmography

Films

1952: Satsujin Yôgisha
1962: Foundry Town as Heisan
1962: The Human Condition as Nonaka Shôi
1962: Kyûpora no aru machi as Hei-san
1962: Harakiri (Seppuku)
1963: Youth of the Beast (Yaju no seishun) as Tatsuo Nomoto
1964: Kwaidan (segment "Chawan no naka")
1965: Ninpō-chushingura
1966: The Pornographers
1968: Ultra Seven 
1969: The Oiwa Phantom as Naosuke
 1969 Chōkōsō no Akebono as Komori
1970: Buraikan
1970: Mujo
1971: Kamen Raidâ tai Shokkâ as Tobei Tachibana
1971: The Return of Ultraman
1972: Ultraman Ace
1972: Lone Wolf and Cub: Baby Cart at the River Styx as Ozunu Kurokuwa
1972: Kamen Raidâ tai jigoku taishi as Tobei Tachibana
1972: Hanzo the Razor

1972: Daigoro vs. Goliath
1973: Kamen Rider V3 the Movie as Tobei Tachibana
1973: Kamen Raidaa Bui Surii tai Desutoron Kaijin as Tobei Tachibana
1974: Karei-naru Ichizoku  (1974)
1974: Kamen Rider X the Movie as Tobei Tachibana
1974: Kamen Raidâ X: Go-Nin Raidâ tai kingu Dâku as Tobei Tachibana
1974: Hanuman pob Har Aimoddaeng
1974: Kamen Rider Amazon: The Movie as Tôbei Tachibana
1975: Kamen Rider Stronger the Movie as Tôbei Tachibana
1976: The Inugami Family as Kôkichi Inugami

1977: Akuma no temari-uta as Hisakabe - Chi'e's Manager
1977: Gokumon-to as Takezô - Chief Fisherman / Narration
1978: Rhyme of Vengeance as Detective Kogure
1978: Hi no Tori as Yamatai
1979: Byoinzaka no Kubikukuri no Ie
1979: Moero Attack
1979: Ultraman: Great Monster Decisive Battle as Captain 'Cap' Toshio Muramatsu
1979: Sanada Yukimura no Bōryaku as Honda Masazumi
1979: Ultraman as Captain 'Cap' Toshio Muramatsu
1979: Immortal Kamen Rider Special as Tobei Tachibana
1979: Nichiren
1980: Shogun Assassin as Lord Kurogawa
1980: Koto
1981: Kofuku
1981: Yuki
1982: Keiji monogatari as Todo
1982: Suspicion as Chief of Police, Ishihara
1982: Kaikyô
1983: The Makioka Sisters
1985: Shokutaku no nai ie
1986: Bakumatsu seishun graffiti: Ronin Sakamoto Ryoma as Hanazuki
1986: Kizudarake no kunshô as Inoue
1986: Jittemai
1988: Kamen Norida
1989: Black Rain as Katayama
1989: Shaso as Takashi Kuriyama
1989: Hana no Furu Gogo 
1990: Best Guy
1990: Kumo no yôni, kaze no yôni as Konton (voice)
1990: Urutora Q za mûbi: Hoshi no densetsu
1991: Tenkawa densetsu satsujin jiken as Chief Police
1991: Satsujin ga ippai
1991: Godzilla vs. King Ghidorah as Yuzo Tsuchiashi
1992: Hashire Melos! as Dionysius II (voice)
1992: Godzilla and Mothra: The Battle for Earth as Yuzo Tsuchiashi
1993: Kaettekita Kogarashi Monjirō
1994: Shijûshichinin no shikaku as Kurobei Ôno
1994: Getting Any? as Chief of World Defence Force
1995: Ie naki ko 2
1996: Ultraman Zearth as Fisherman (cameo)
1996: Gamera 2: Attack of Legion as Soldier (cameo)
1996: Yatsuhaka-mura as Head of a factory (final film role)

Television
1966: Ultra Q (TV series) as Lieutenant Colonel Amano
1966-1967: Ultraman (TV series) as Captain 'Cap' Toshio Muramatsu
1968-1969: Operation : Mystery  (TV Series) as Taizō Machida
1971:  Daichūshingura as Terasaka Kichiemon
1971-1973: Kamen Rider (TV series) as Tōbei Tachibana
1972: Shin Heike Monogatari (Taiga drama)
1973: Kunitori Monogatari (Taiga drama)
1973: Kamen Rider V3 (TV series) as Tōbei Tachibana
1974: Kamen Rider X (TV series) as Tōbei Tachibana
1974: Kamen Rider Amazon (TV series) as Tōbei Tachibana
1975: Kamen Rider Stronger (TV series) as Tōbei Tachibana
1976: The Kagestar as Inspector Tonda
1979: Akō Rōshi (TV series) as Hara Sōemon
1983-84: Seibu Keisatsu (TV series) as Detective Minami Chōtarō
1994: Furuhata Ninzaburō (TV series) (ep.5)

Dubbing
John Wayne
Stagecoach — Henry the Ringo Kid
3 Godfathers — Robert Marmaduke Hightower
She Wore a Yellow Ribbon — Captain Nathan Brittles
The Searchers — Ethan Edwards
Rio Bravo — John T. Chance
The Horse Soldiers – Colonel John Marlowe
North to Alaska – Sam McCord
True Grit — Rooster Cogburn
Chisum — John Chisum
The Cowboys — Wil Andersen
Rooster Cogburn — Rooster Cogburn
The Shootist — John Bernard Books
First Blood (1990 TBS edition), Colonel Sam Trautman (Richard Crenna)

Notes

Bibliography
 Oyassan: Tachibana, Tobei, fansite
 
 Yoshimaru, Satoko (November 1996). "Captain Mura Dies at Age 65". Kaiju-Fan Vol. 1, No. 4. p. 5.

1930 births
1996 deaths
Deaths from lung cancer
Male actors from Tokyo
Japanese male voice actors
20th-century Japanese male actors